The 1895 Primera División was the 4th season of top-flight football in Argentina. The season began on May 10 and ended on August 30.

Lomas won the tournament achieving its 3rd consecutive title. The runner-up was Lomas Academy, a second team from the same institution. This was the last tournament played by Buenos Aires and Rosario Railway before merging with Belgrano Athletic Club.

Final table

References

Argentine Primera División seasons
1895 in Argentine football
1895 in South American football